I'm Losing You is a 1998 American drama film written and directed by Bruce Wagner. The film starred Andrew McCarthy and is an adaptation of Wagner's 1996 novel I'm Losing You.

Plot
A melodrama of a wealthy Los Angeles family - and the journey each one begins after a death in the family. The title of the film refers not only to the loss of life and love, but to a phrase used by most Angelenos while talking on cellular phones; I'm Losing You... "I'm Losing You" follows the path of each character after a cataclysmic event: the death of Bertie's young daughter Tiffany, in an "accident". The family comes closer together in the wake of such an event, seeking to recover from a blow that has driven each one to near madness.

Reception
Review aggregator Rotten Tomatoes gives the film a 40% approval rating based on five reviews, with an average rating of 4.85/10.

References

External links

1998 films
1998 drama films
American drama films
Films set in New Jersey
Films shot in New Jersey
Films shot in New York (state)
Films produced by Christine Vachon
Killer Films films
Lionsgate films
1990s English-language films
1990s American films